George Alfred Peters (16 June 1912 – 21 September 1988) was an  Australian rules footballer who played with North Melbourne in the Victorian Football League (VFL).

Peters later served in the Australian Army during World War II.

Notes

External links 

1912 births
1988 deaths
Australian rules footballers from Victoria (Australia)
North Melbourne Football Club players